The 1952–53 Cypriot Cup was the 16th edition of the Cypriot Cup. A total of 14 clubs entered the competition. It began on 10 January 1953 with the first round and concluded on 19 April 1953 with the final which was held at GSP Stadium. EPA Larnaca FC won their 4th Cypriot Cup trophy after beating Çetinkaya Türk 2–1 in the final.

Format 
In the 1952–53 Cypriot Cup, participated all the teams of the Cypriot First Division and six teams of the Cypriot Second Division.

The competition consisted of four knock-out rounds. In all rounds each tie was played as a single leg and was held at the home ground of the one of the two teams, according to the draw results. Each tie winner was qualifying to the next round. If a match was drawn, extra time was following. If extra time was drawn, there was a replay match.

First round

Quarter-finals

Semi-finals 

1Anorthosis Famagusta not show to the replay match due to violent behavior of the first game

Final

Sources

Bibliography

See also 
 Cypriot Cup
 1952–53 Cypriot First Division

Cypriot Cup seasons
1952–53 domestic association football cups
1952–53 in Cypriot football